Dmitriy Gotfrid (born January 22, 1984) is an amateur boxer from Kazakhstan who won the bronze medal in the Heavyweight (-91 kg) division at the 2006 Boxing at the 2006 Asian Games .

Career
2002 he lost the final of the junior world championships to Osmay Acosta at 165 lbs.

At the Asian Games 2006 he lost his semifinal against Iran's eventual gold medalist Ali Mazaheri 19-25.

References

1984 births
Living people
Asian Games medalists in boxing
Boxers at the 2006 Asian Games
Kazakhstani male boxers
Asian Games bronze medalists for Kazakhstan
Medalists at the 2006 Asian Games
Heavyweight boxers
21st-century Kazakhstani people